The Shanghai Bank of China Tower, is a 53-story tower in the Pudong District, Shanghai, China. It was built for the Bank of China by the Japanese architectural firm Nikken Sekkei.

In popular culture
It was one of the three buildings that were part of the filming of Mission: Impossible III starring Tom Cruise. It is the building where Tom Cruise did a bungee jump.

See also
 List of tallest buildings in Shanghai

References

External links
 Official website
 Branch Details for Shanghai Bank of China Tower 
 
 

Bank of China
Office buildings completed in 2000
Skyscraper office buildings in Shanghai